Miyaoku Dam is a concrete gravity dam located in Nara prefecture in Japan. The dam is used for agriculture and water supply. The catchment area of the dam is 2.9 km2. The dam impounds about 5  ha of land when full and can store 580 thousand cubic meters of water. The construction of the dam was started on 1983 and completed in 1998.

References

Dams in Nara Prefecture
1998 establishments in Japan